Tile Hill railway station is situated in the west of Tile Hill, Coventry, in the West Midlands of England. The station, and all trains serving it, are operated by West Midlands Railway.

History
The station was opened in 1850, and was originally known as Allesley Lane, in 1857 it was renamed Allesley Gate, it assumed its current name of Tile Hill in 1864. The station was located at a point where the railway crossed the road on a level crossing. It originally had staggered platforms, with one platform on one side of the level crossing, and the other on the other side. The station was completely rebuilt in 1966 when the line was electrified in its present more conventional form.

The level crossing adjacent to the station lasted until September 2004, when a large bridge was built to carry road traffic over the railway and a footbridge built to connect the station platforms, which opened in March 2005. Level crossings at the Berkswell railway station and the Canley railway station have also been removed to upgrade the line to carry more high speed trains.

In 2009 the railway platform was extended, almost doubling the size.  This was also the case for a number of smaller stations on this route.

Historically this has been a busy railway station used by many local and non-local residents, however, recently after the sale of the overflow carpark to developers there continues to be substantial parking issues at the station and in and around the neighbouring roads.

Facilities

The station has a ticket office located on platform 1 which is open Monday 06:00–19:00, Tuesday-Thursday 07:00–19:00, Friday 07:00–20:00, Saturday 08:00–19:00 and Sunday 08:30–14:00. When the ticket office is open tickets must be purchased before boarding the train. Outside of these times there is a ticket machine outside the ticket office which accepts card payments only - cash and voucher payments can be made to the senior conductor on the train.

Services
Tile Hill is served by two trains per hour each way, to  northbound and to  via  southbound.

On Sundays, the service is hourly during the morning with 2 trains per hour running through the afternoon.

All services are operated by West Midlands Trains. Most services are operated under the London Northwestern Railway brand but some services (mainly early morning and late night services which start/terminate at ) operate under the West Midlands Railway brand.

References

External links

Station on navigable O.S. map
Tile Hill Station - On Warwickshirerailways.com

Railway stations in Coventry
DfT Category E stations
Former London and North Western Railway stations
Railway stations in Great Britain opened in 1850
Railway stations served by West Midlands Trains